Carol: A Day in a Girl's Life is the 6th album by Japanese rock band TM Network, released on December 9, 1988 under Epic Records.

Other Media

Book 
Carol is a novel written by Naoto Kine, one of a member of TM Network on 1989 April 15.

Anime 
Carol is an anime OVA featuring character designs by Yun Kōga and Toshiki Yoshida, based on story by Naoto Kine. It was the biggest selling anime video of the year in Japan.

Plot 
Carol was born in a family revolving around music, since she is the daughter of famous musician Lionel Mudagolas. She realizes that something unusual is happening to the world, as her father is having a harder time playing his cello and also her favorite band is unable to perform as they did before. She is teleported into a world connected to hers to fight a demon lord called Gigantica. Fighting alongside her are three heroes who have been awaiting Carol eagerly.

Cast 
Japanese voice actor
Aya Hisakawa as Carol Mue Douglas
Takashi Utsunomiya as Flash
Nobuo Tobita as Tico Brani
Kaneto Shiozawa as Clark Maxwell
Show Hayami as Quepri
Hideyuki Tanaka as Ryman Mue Douglas
Mika Doi as Reet
Masaru Ikeda as Tios
Eiko Yamada as Domos
Tomoko Maruo as Alice
Kazue Ikura as Eddie
Masashi Hirose as U4
Sakiko Tamagawa as Fairy
Miki Itō as Therese
Michitaka Kobayashi as Rydah

Theme music 
"Just One Victory"
Lyrics, Composition  Arrangement: Tetsuya Komuro
Artist: TM Network

References

External links
 

1990 anime OVAs
Magic Bus (studio)
Yun Kōga